Abdul Aziz is a Bangladeshi film producer and script writer. He is the chairman of Jaaz Multimedia. He produced more than 40 films in Bangladesh and India.

Aziz has been a fugitive since 2019, when the Customs Intelligence and Investigation Department of the National Board of Revenue accused him of money laundering. Cases have also been filed against him for embezzlement. He has reportedly been living in Canada or Malaysia. In the year of 2021, Jazz multimedia announced that, it would make 3 films which would cost more than 3.5 crores.

Filmography

Producer

References

External links 

1975 births
Living people
People from Dhaka
Bangladeshi filmmakers